Julia Margareta Zigiotti Olme (born 24 December 1997) is a Swedish professional footballer who plays as a forward for Brighton & Hove Albion of the English FA Women's Super League. She previously played for the Damallsvenskan team BK Häcken. Zigiotti Olme made her debut for the Sweden women's national football team in October 2018 and appeared at the 2019 FIFA Women's World Cup.

Club career
In January 2022 she joined FA Women's Super League club Brighton & Hove Albion after three seasons with BK Häcken (known as Kopparbergs/Göteborg FC prior to 2021). She signed an 18-month contract in a double transfer with team mate Emma Kullberg.

International career
Zigiotti Olme was "in shock" to be called up to the senior Sweden national team in September 2018. She was pleased that one of the opponents were Italy, as her mother is Italian. Zigiotti Olme was a childhood Juventus supporter, and she idolised Alessandro Del Piero. In May 2019 she was selected by Sweden for the 2019 FIFA Women's World Cup.

Private life 
Zigiotti Olme is in a relationship with her club teammate and fellow Swedish footballer Emma Kullberg.

References

External links 

 
 
 
 

1997 births
Living people
Swedish women's footballers
Sweden women's international footballers
Damallsvenskan players
BK Häcken FF players
Hammarby Fotboll (women) players
AIK Fotboll (women) players
Women's association football forwards
2019 FIFA Women's World Cup players
Swedish people of Italian descent
Brighton & Hove Albion W.F.C. players
Women's Super League players
Expatriate women's footballers in England
Swedish expatriate sportspeople in England
Swedish expatriate women's footballers
People from Upplands Väsby Municipality
Sportspeople from Stockholm County
Swedish LGBT sportspeople
LGBT association football players
Lesbian sportswomen
21st-century Swedish LGBT people